Naif Eisa Al-Dhefiri (born 25 February 1982) is a Saudi professional footballer who plays as a defensive midfielder or a central defender.

External links

References

1982 births
Living people
Saudi Arabian footballers
Al Batin FC players
Saudi First Division League players
Saudi Professional League players
Saudi Second Division players
Saudi Fourth Division players
Association football defenders
Association football midfielders